The 1933–34 Scottish Districts season is a record of all the rugby union matches for Scotland's district teams.

History

Edinburgh District beat Glasgow District in the Inter-City match.

Results

Inter-City

Glasgow District: J. L. Cotter (Hillhead H.S.F.P.); J. E. Forrest (Glasgow Academicals), A. Ross (Hillhead H.S.F.P.), W. A. Ross (Hillhead H.S.F.P.), and R. W. Shaw (Glasgow H.S.F.P.); W. C. W. Murdoch (Hillhead H.S.F.P.) and I. E. Dawson (Hillhead H.S.F.P.); W. A. Burnet (West of Scotland), A. M. Haddow (Glasgow Academicals), H. C. Kennedy (Glasgow H.S.F.P.), L. B. Lambie (Glasgow H.S.F.P.), G. C. Langlands (Glasgow H.S.F.P.), Ian MacLachlan (Kelvinside Academicals), Ian Mac- Laren (Glasgow H.S.F.P.), and E. A. Young (Hillhead H.S.F.P.) (capt.).

Edinburgh District: K. W. Marshall (Edinburgh Academicals); Jack Park (Royal High School F.P.), W. D. Emslie (Royal High School F.P.), B. R. Tod (Edinburgh Academicals), and J. J. Sanderson (Watsonians); P. M. S. Gedge (Edinburgh Wanderers) and K. S. H. Wilson (Watsonians) ; N. M. Lund (Edinburgh University), M. S. Stewart (Stewart's College F.P.), J. M. Ritchie (Watsonians), T. S. Brotherstone (Royal High School F.P.), P. W. Tait (Royal High School F.P.), J. G. Watherston (Edinburgh Wanderers). J. D. Lowe (Heriot's F.P.), and A. L. Glover (Stewart's College F.P.)

Other Scottish matches

North: 

South:

Trial matches

Scotland Probables: 

Scotland Possibles:

English matches

No other District matches played.

International matches

No touring matches this season.

References

1933–34 in Scottish rugby union
Scottish Districts seasons